The Very Best of Elastic No-No Band So Far is the first official CD release of the antifolk group Elastic No-No Band.

It is a compilation of home-recorded tracks taken from the four lo-fi CD-R albums that Justin Remer recorded using the name Elastic No-No Band, augmented by five songs performed by the trio formation of the band.

Four of the songs included here -- "I Am Klaus Kinski (And This Is My Song)," "Cheese Fries," "(Everywhere I Look) I See Your Face," and "A Modest Proposal (For Laura Cantrell)"—were re-recorded in different arrangements on Elastic No-No Band's first studio album, My 3 Addictions.

Three of the other songs -- "Run-DMC," "Let's Fuck," and "Turn Out Right"—were re-recorded in different arrangements on the band's second studio album, Fustercluck!!!, with new, slightly altered titles.

Track listing
 Run-DMC
 Let's Fuck
 Turn Out Right
 I Am Klaus Kinski (And This Is My Song)
 You Never Swam
 Cheese Fries
 (Everywhere I Look) I See Your Face
 Jeanette Is Working
 You Think It's Wrong (To Sing Along)
 A Modest Proposal (For Laura Cantrell)
 Tough Guy
 Turn Out Right Waltz

Personnel
Justin Remer - Vocals, Guitar, Bass and Keyboard on track 1
Herb Scher - Piano on tracks 4, 5, 7, 10, 12
Preston Spurlock - Bass on tracks 4, 5, 7, 10; Melodica on track 10; Accordion on track 12
Clint Scheibner - "Silent Drumming"

References

2006 debut albums
Elastic No-No Band albums
2006 greatest hits albums